Statistics of the Scottish Football League in season 1904–05.

Scottish League Division One

Scottish League Division Two

See also
1904–05 in Scottish football

References

 
1904-05